The following lists events that happened during 2012 in Estonia.

Incumbents
 President: Toomas Hendrik Ilves 
 Prime Minister: Andrus Ansip

Events
Estonia in the Eurovision Song Contest 2012

Deaths
24 April - Erast Parmasto, botanist and mycologist (b. 1928)

See also
2012 in Estonian football
2012 in Estonian television

 
2010s in Estonia
Estonia
Estonia
Years of the 21st century in Estonia